George Putnam Upton (18341919) was an American journalist and author.

Biography
George Putnam Upton was born in Roxbury, Massachusetts on October 25, 1834. He took an MA at Brown University in 1854, and soon after started writing for newspapers in Chicago. In 1862, Upton became the music critic for the Chicago Tribune. He became the senior editor at the Tribune in 1881 and remained in the post until 1905. A. C. McLurg & Co. published several of his books.

He married Sara E. Bliss in 1861. He remarried to Georgiana S. Wood on September 21, 1880.

Upton died from pneumonia at his home in Chicago on May 19, 1919. He was interred at Oak Woods Cemetery.

Select bibliography
The standard oratorios: their stories, their music, and their composers; a handbook (1866)
Letters of Peregrine Pickle (1869)
Woman in music (1880)
The standard operas, their plots and their music (1885)
The standard operas: their plots, their music, and their composers (1886)
The standard cantatas; their stories, their music, and their composers; a handbook (1887)
The standard symphonies, their history, their music, and their composers; a handbook (1888)
Musical Pastels (1902)
Theodore Thomas: A Musical Autobiography (editor) (1905)
Musical memories : my recollections of celebrities of the half century, 1850-1900 (1908)
The standard concert guide (1909)

References

External links

 

1834 births
1919 deaths
19th-century American journalists
Brown University alumni
American male journalists
19th-century American male writers
20th-century American journalists
20th-century American male writers
American music critics